Jim Sauter  (June 1, 1943 – October 31, 2014) was an American stock car racing driver from Necedah, Wisconsin. He formerly raced in all three of NASCAR's national series, and is best known for having been a test driver for the International Race of Champions, as well as winning two championships in the Midwest-based ARTGO Challenge Series.

Racing career

Sauter started racing in 1964 in a modified at Raceway Park in Savage, Minnesota. He moved up to late models the following year. Sauter moved to Wisconsin. He won the first race at the LaCrosse Interstate Fairgrounds (now LaCrosse Fairgrounds Speedway) on July 14, 1970. His career took off after he won the North Star 500 at the Minnesota State Fair in a Dave Marcis Chevelle. Sauter said "The funny thing about that race was the fact that we had a barn full of various brands of tires that we wanted to use up and ended up with Goodyear on the outside and Firestone on the inside for no other reason than that. Everyone thought it must be the hot tip." Marcis called Sauter in 1978 and asked him to drive his racecar in the ARCA 200. Sauter battled Bruce Hill for the win on the last lap. They crashed, with Hill ending his race along the wall and Sauter won.

Sauter raced part time in the NASCAR Winston Cup Series in the 1980s and 1990s,  posting four top ten finishes in 76 starts. He said his biggest thrill was leading the 1982 Daytona 500. He was an independent (non-factory) driver with limited funds. To help pay the bills, Sauter did Goodyear tire tests along with Marcis.

Sauter raced primarily in the ARTGO and ASA series. Sauter returned to Wisconsin to win the 1981 track championship at Wisconsin International Raceway. Sauter won the 1981 and 1982 ARTGO championships with 16 of 20 career victories in those years (seven in 1981 and nine in 1982). Sauter won several major regional races including the 1980 National Short Track Championship at Rockford Speedway and the 1983 All American 400 at Nashville Fairgrounds Speedway. He also competed at the Slinger Nationals, Snowball Derby, Winchester 400 and the World Crown.

Head of racing family
His sons Tim, Jay, and Johnny have followed his footsteps by racing on the NASCAR circuit. His other son Jim, Jr. has raced on regional events along with his grandson Travis Sauter. Sauter raced in his final NASCAR Nationwide Series at the Milwaukee Mile racing against Tim, Jay and Johnny. None of Sauter's seven daughters nor his son Joe are involved in racing.

Sauter and rival Joe Shear are connected in another way; Shear's eponymous son became son Johnny's crew chief in the NASCAR Gander Outdoors Truck Series, winning Daytona and the series championship.

IROC involvement
Sauter was also well known for preparing the setups and testing International Race of Champions (IROC) cars with Dick Trickle and Dave Marcis.

Death
Sauter died following a brief illness on October 31, 2014. He was 71 years old.

Motorsports career results

Racing record

NASCAR
(key) (Bold – Pole position awarded by qualifying time. Italics – Pole position earned by points standings or practice time. * – Most laps led.)

Winston Cup Series

Daytona 500

Busch Series

Craftsman Truck Series

ARCA Hooters SuperCar Series
(key) (Bold – Pole position awarded by qualifying time. Italics – Pole position earned by points standings or practice time. * – Most laps led.)

References

External links
 
 Ultimate Racing History Profile
 The Third Turn Profile

2014 deaths
People from Necedah, Wisconsin
1943 births
Racing drivers from Wisconsin
NASCAR drivers
American Speed Association drivers
International Race of Champions drivers
Richard Childress Racing drivers